The 2018 Tunbridge Wells Borough Council election took place on 3 May 2018 to elect members of Tunbridge Wells Borough Council in England. This was on the same day as other local elections.

Ward results

Benenden and Cranbook

Brenchley and Horsmonden

Broadwater

Culverden

Hawkhurst and Sandhurst

Paddock Wood East

Paddock Wood West

Pantiles and St. Mark's

Park

Pembury

Sherwood

Southborough and High Brooms

Southborough North

Speldhurst and Bidborough

St. James'

St. John's

References

2018 English local elections
2018
2010s in Kent